= University of Newcastle =

University of Newcastle can refer to:

- Newcastle University, a university in the United Kingdom
- University of Newcastle (Australia), a university in New South Wales, Australia
